Jean Landry (born June 14, 1953) is a Canadian former professional ice hockey defenceman. He was selected by the Buffalo Sabres in the second round (28th overall) of the 1973 NHL Amateur Draft, and was also drafted by the Quebec Nordiques in the fourth round (42nd overall) of the 1973 WHA Amateur Draft.

Career statistics

Awards and honours

References

External links

1953 births
Living people
Buffalo Sabres draft picks
Canadian ice hockey defencemen
Charlotte Checkers (SHL) players
Cincinnati Swords players
French Quebecers
Hershey Bears players
Ice hockey people from Montreal
Johnstown Jets players
Quebec Nordiques (WHA) draft picks
Quebec Remparts players
Roanoke Valley Rebels (SHL) players
Tidewater Sharks players
Canadian expatriate ice hockey players in the United States